Plekhovo is a village in western Russia, in Sudzansky District of Kursk Oblast.

Climate 
Plekhovo, like the surrounding region, has a humid continental climate with warm summers and relatively warm winters.

History 
In March 2023, videos emerged reportedly showing anti-Putin, pro-Ukrainian Russian insurgents in Plekhovo, where they showed they had allegedly planted landmines in the village and invited Russians to join them, paralleling the recent 2023 Bryansk Oblast attack.

Demographics

Features 
There is a Palace of Culture in the village, and 497 houses.

References 

Populated places in Sudzhansky District